Oemini is an obsolete tribe of beetles in the subfamily Cerambycinae, now placed in the Xystrocerini.

It contained the following genera:

 Amphelissoeme
 Aponoeme
 Argentinoeme
 Atenizus
 Austroeme
 Chromoeme
 Eudistenia
 Euryprosopus
 Gounelleoeme
 Haplidoeme
 Kalore
 Liberedaxia
 Macroeme
 Malacopterus
 Martinsia
 Metalloeme
 Methioeme
 Methioides
 Mimoeme
 Necydalosaurus
 Neoeme
 Nesoeme
 Ocroeme
 Oeme
 Paramartinsia
 Paranoplium
 Paratemnopis
 Phrynoeme
 Placoeme
 Proeme
 Sepaicutea
 Sphagoeme
 Sphalloeme
 Stenoeme
 Temnopis
 Tristachycera
 Vandykea
 Xanthoeme

References

 
Cerambycinae
Obsolete animal taxa